Stewart Henry Williamson (7 April 1926 – 24 June 2008) was an English footballer who played as a winger in the Football League for Tranmere Rovers and Swindon Town.

References

External links

1926 births
2008 deaths
People from Wallasey
English footballers
Association football wingers
Harrogate Town A.F.C. players
Swindon Town F.C. players
Tranmere Rovers F.C. players
Merthyr Tydfil F.C. players
English Football League players